Marco Bonamico (born 18 January 1957 in Genoa) is a former professional basketball player from Italy. At a height of 2.01 m (6'7") tall, he played at the small forward and power forward positions. During his playing career, his nickname was, "il Marine" ("The Marine").

Professional career
Bonamico was the top scorer of the EuroLeague Finals in 1981.

National team career
With the senior Italian national basketball team, Bonamico won a silver medal at the 1980 Moscow Summer Olympic Games. He also won a gold medal at the 1983 EuroBasket. He also played at the 1977 EuroBasket, the 1978 FIBA World Championship, the 1979 EuroBasket, and the 1984 Los Angeles Summer Olympic Games.

References

External links
FIBA Profile
FIBA Olympics Profile
FIBA Europe Profile
Italian League Profile 

1957 births
Living people
Basketball players at the 1980 Summer Olympics
Basketball players at the 1984 Summer Olympics
FIBA EuroBasket-winning players
Fortitudo Pallacanestro Bologna players
Italian men's basketball players
1978 FIBA World Championship players
Medalists at the 1980 Summer Olympics
Olympic basketball players of Italy
Olympic medalists in basketball
Olympic silver medalists for Italy
Power forwards (basketball)
Small forwards
Sportspeople from Genoa
Virtus Bologna players